Emmanuel Goldsmith (born 21 October 1909, date of death unknown) was a Swiss sprinter. He competed in the men's 100 metres at the 1928 Summer Olympics.

References

External links

1909 births
Year of death missing
Athletes (track and field) at the 1928 Summer Olympics
Swiss male sprinters
Olympic athletes of Switzerland
Place of birth missing